The 2014 Challenger Ficrea was a professional tennis tournament play on hardcourts. In its 2014 Challenger Ficrea Singles, Donald Young was the defending champion, but decided not to compete.

Rajeev Ram won the title, defeating Samuel Groth in the final, 6–2, 6–2.

Seeds

Draw

Finals

Top half

Bottom half

References
 Main Draw
 Qualifying Draw

Challenger Ficrea - Singles
2014 Singles